Leonardo Bortolini (born 1977) is a Brazilian handball player who plays for the club Umopar Larrafkl Londrina and the Brazilian national team. He participated at the 2008 Summer Olympics, where the Brazilian team placed 11th.

References

1977 births
Living people
Brazilian male handball players
Olympic handball players of Brazil
Handball players at the 2008 Summer Olympics
Handball players at the 2011 Pan American Games
Handball players at the 2007 Pan American Games
Pan American Games medalists in handball
Pan American Games gold medalists for Brazil
Medalists at the 2007 Pan American Games
Medalists at the 2011 Pan American Games
Handball coaches of international teams
20th-century Brazilian people
21st-century Brazilian people